This is a list of invertebrates, animals without a backbone, that are commonly kept in freshwater aquaria by hobby aquarists. Numerous shrimp species of various kinds, crayfish, a number of freshwater snail species, and at least one freshwater clam species are found in freshwater aquaria.

Crustaceans

Shrimp
 Arachnochium kulsiense, Sand shrimp
 Atya gabonensis, African giant shrimp
 Atyaephyra desmaresti, Iberian/European dwarf shrimp
 Atyoida pilipes, Green lace shrimp
 Atyopsis moluccensis, Bamboo Shrimp
 Caridina cf. babaulti var. green, green shrimp
 Caridina babaulti var. malaya, Malayan dwarf shrimp
 Caridina babaulti var. stripes, striped shrimp
 Caridina caerulea, blue leg Poso shrimp
 Caridina gracilirostris,   red-nose shrimp, Pinocchio shrimp
 Caridina cf. gracilirostris,  white-nose Shrimp
 Caridina multidentata, Amano shrimp
 Caridina cf. cantonensis var. bee, bee shrimp
 Caridina cf. cantonensis var. blue tiger, blue tiger shrimp
 Caridina cf. cantonensis var. crystal black, crystal black shrimp
 Caridina cf. cantonensis var. crystal red, crystal red shrimp
 Caridina cf. cantonensis var. tiger, tiger shrimp
 Caridina cf. serrata var. chinese zebra, Chinese zebra shrimp
 Caridina sp., Indian Dwarf Shrimp
 Caridina sp., Indian Whitebanded Shrimp
 Caridina woltereckae, Sulawesi harlequin shrimp
 Caridina spongicola, Sulawesi harlequin shrimp
 Caridina dennerli, Sulawesi cardinal shrimp
 Caridina cf. breviata, bumblebee shrimp
 Caridina sp., black midget shrimp
 Caridina serratirostris, Ninja Shrimp
 Caridina thambipillai, sunkist shrimp
 Caridina typus, Australian amano shrimp
 Caridina pareparensis parvidentata, Malawa shrimp
 Caridina simoni simoni, Sri Lankan Dwarf shrimp
 Desmocaris elongata, Guinea Swamp Shrimp
 Euryrhynchus amazoniensis, Amazon zebra shrimp
 Macrobrachium assamensis, Red claw shrimp
 Macrobrachium dayanum, Rusty longarm shrimp
 Macrobrachium eriocheirum, Fuzzy claw shrimp
 Macrobrachium faustinum, Caribbean longarm shrimp
 Macrobrachium lanchesteri, a.k.a. Cryphiops lanchesteri,  Riceland prawn
 Micratya poeyi, Caribbean dwarf filter shrimp
 Neocaridina davidi (wild type), Wild type cherry shrimp
 Neocaridina davidi var. red, Cherry shrimp
 Neocaridina davidi var. yellow, Yellow shrimp
 Neocaridina davidi var. blue, Taiwan Pale Blue Shrimp
 Neocaridina palmata, Marbled dwarf shrimp
 Neocaridina cf. zhangjiajiensis var. blue pearl, Blue pearl shrimp
 Neocaridina cf. zhangjiajiensis var. white, Snowball shrimp
 Palaemonetes kadiakensis, Mississippi grass shrimp
 Palaemonetes ivonicus, amazon glass shrimp
 Palaemonetes paludosus, American ghost (glass, grass) shrimp
 Potamalpheops sp., purple zebra shrimp
 Xiphocaris elongata, Yellow nose shrimp

Crayfish
 Cambarellus diminutus least dwarf crayfish
 Cambarellus montezumae, Acocil
 Cambarellus shufeldtii, Cajun Dwarf Crayfish
 Cambarellus patzcuarensis, Mexican Dwarf Crayfish
 Cherax boesemani, supernova crayfish
 Cherax destructor, Common Yabby
 Cherax peknyi, zebra crayfish
 Cherax quadricarinatus, Australian Red Claw Crayfish
 Cherax snowden, emerald fire crayfish
 Faxonius immunis, paper shell crayfish
 Faxonius limosus, spiny cheek crayfish
 Pacifastacus leniusculus, Signal Crayfish
 Procambarus alleni, Blue crayfish
 Procambarus braswelli, Waccamaw crayfish
 Procambarus clarkii, Red Swamp Crayfish
 Procambarus milleri, Miami cave crayfish
 Procambarus virginalis, Marbled Crayfish

Crabs
 Limnopilos naiyanetri, Thai Micro Crabs
 Parathelphusa pantherina, Panther Crabs
 Ptychognathus barbatus, freshwater pom pom crab

Branchiopods 
 Lepidurus apus, golden tadpole shrimp
 Triops longicaudatus, longtail tadpole shrimp
 Triops australiensis, Australian tadpole shrimp
 Triops cancriformis, European tadpole shrimp
 Triops granarius, Asian tadpole shrimp
 Triops newberryi, desert tadpole shrimp
 Branchinella thailandensis, Thai fairy shrimp
 Branchinecta mackini, alkali fairy shrimp
 Branchinecta gigas, giant fairy shrimp
 Thamnocephalus platyurus, beavertail fairy shrimp
 Streptocephalus sealii, redtail fairy shrimp
 Streptocephalus sp., dry lake fairy shrimp
 Brachinecta sp., winter fairy shrimp
 Daphnia magna, large water flea
 Daphnia pulex, common water flea
 Moina, Japanese water flea
 Diplostraca, clam shrimp

Isopods 
 Asellus aquaticus, water slater
 Trachelipus rathkii, Rathki's Isopod(lives in periodical floods)

Amphipods 
 Gammarus pulex, freshwater shrimp
 Hyalella azteca, Mexican freshwater shrimp

Copepods 
 Cyclops sp., water flea

Hermit crab
 Clibanarius fonticola, freshwater hermit crab

Molluscs

Gastropods
 Asolene spixii (zebra apple snail)
 Marisa cornuarietis (Colombian ramshorn apple snail)
 Planorbidae species (ramshorn snails)
 Pomacea diffusa (spike-topped apple snail)
 Pomacea canaliculata (channeled apple snail)
 Physidae species (bladder or tadpole snails)
 Lymnaeidae (pond and melantho snails)
 Lymnaea stagnalis (great pond snail)
 Planorbarius corneus (Great Ramshorn)
 Melanoides tuberculata (red-rimmed melania or Malaysian trumpet snail)
 Tarebia granifera (quilted melania or spike-tail trumpet snail)
 Cipangopaludina malleata (Japanese trapdoor snail)
 Clithon corona (horned nerite snail)
 Neritina natalensis (zebra nerite snail)
 Vittina semiconica (red onion or tire tracked nerite snail)
 Neritina reclivata (olive nerite snail)
 Neripteron violaceum "Red Lips" (Red Lip Nerite Snail)
 Septaria porcellana (freshwater limpet)
 Neritina sp. (mosaic nerite snail)
 Neritina sp. (tribal nerite snail)
 Brotia pagodula (horned armour snail)
 Pachymelania byronensis (west African freshwater snail)
 Neritina pulligera (dusky nerite)
 Paludomus sulcatus (bella snail)
 Thiara cancellata (hairy tower lid snail)
 Taia naticoides (piano snail)
 Brotia herculea (giant tower cap snail)
 Planorbella duryi (miniature red ramshorn snail)
 Tylomelania species (Tylo or Sulawesi snails)
 Tylomelania sp. Poso "Yellow"
 Tylomelania sp. Poso "Orange Flash"
 Tylomelania patriarchalis (black Sulawesi snails)
 Cipangopaludina lecythoides (tiger tuba snail)
 Faunus ater (black devil snail)
 Anentome helena (assassin snail)

Bivalves
 Corbicula fluminea (Asian clam)

Worms

Annelids
 Barbronia weberi, Asian freshwater leech
 Helobdella europaea, European flat leech
 Lumbriculus variegatus, California blackworm
 Tubifex tubifex, sludge worm

See also 

List of fish common names
List of freshwater aquarium plant species
List of freshwater aquarium amphibian species
List of freshwater aquarium fish species
List of brackish aquarium fish species
List of marine aquarium fish species
List of marine aquarium invertebrate species

References

Fishkeeping
Lists of invertebrates
Freshwater aquarium invertebrates
freshwater invertibrate